Toy District may refer to:
 Toy District, Los Angeles
 the Flatiron District in New York City (historically)